Masterstroke may refer to:

 Master Stroke, Italian crime film
 "Masterstroke of Malevolence", episode of Fillmore!